Don't Panic: The Official Hitchhiker's Guide to the Galaxy Companion is a book by Neil Gaiman about Douglas Adams and The Hitchhiker's Guide to the Galaxy. The book was originally published in 1986 in the United States and United Kingdom by Titan Books.

A second edition, retitled Don't Panic: Douglas Adams & The Hitch Hiker's Guide to the Galaxy was published in the United Kingdom in July 1993, containing additional material by David K. Dickson.

A third edition, with another slight title revision (now known as Don't Panic: Douglas Adams & The Hitchhiker's Guide to the Galaxy) was published in the UK by Titan Books in June 2002, and contains further additional material, this time by M. J. Simpson.

An updated edition was published by Titan Books in October 2003.

A further edition was published by Titan Books in September 2009.

The Hitchhiker's Guide to the Galaxy
1988 books
Books by Neil Gaiman